The 1998 Nabisco Dinah Shore was a women's professional golf tournament, held March 26–29 at Mission Hills Country Club in Rancho Mirage, California. This was the 27th edition of the Nabisco Dinah Shore, and the sixteenth as a major championship.

Pat Hurst won her only major title, one stroke ahead of runner-up Helen Dobson. At the final green, she sank a  putt for par and gained her second tour victory.

At , the course was the longest on the LPGA Tour in 1998.

Past champions in the field

Made the cut

Source:

Missed the cut

Source:

Final leaderboard
Sunday, March 28, 1998

Source:

References

External links
Golf Observer leaderboard

Chevron Championship
Golf in California
Nabisco Dinah Shore
Nabisco Dinah Shore
Nabisco Dinah Shore
Nabisco Dinah Shore